The 2005–06 Essex Senior Football League season was the 35th in the history of Essex Senior Football League a football competition in England.

League table

The league featured 14 clubs which competed in the league last season, along with two new clubs:
AFC Hornchurch, reformed club after Hornchurch folded
Tilbury, relegated from the Southern League

League table

References

Essex Senior Football League seasons
9